Budnick is a surname. Notable people with the surname include:

Dean Budnick, American writer, music critic and journalist
Mike Budnick (1919–1999), American baseball player
Scott Budnick (disambiguation), multiple people
Sidney Jonas Budnick (1921–1994), American artist

See also
Budnick Hill, a hill of Wilkes Land, Antarctica